Lucien Mathys (9 April 1924 – 19 December 2010) was a Belgian racing cyclist. He rode in the 1948 Tour de France.

References

External links

1924 births
2010 deaths
Belgian male cyclists
Cyclists from East Flanders
People from De Pinte
20th-century Belgian people